"Light On" is a song by American singer and songwriter Maggie Rogers. It was released on October 10, 2018 as the fifth single of Rogers' major-label debut studio album, Heard It in a Past Life (2019). Rogers co-wrote the song with Kid Harpoon and both co-produced it with Greg Kurstin.

Background
Announcing the song release, she revealed that the track was about "gratitude". "it’s the most vulnerable ive ever felt in a song" , she tweeted. In an interview with Billboard, Rogers revealed that the song was about "feeling out of control". She recalled, "There's always a part of it that has to feel like work or something that's not entirely you".

During an interview with Zane Lowe on Apple Music's Beats 1 on October 10, 2018, Rogers said,

Critical reception
Meredith Nardino of Atwood Magazine said that "...Rogers is laying her whole heart on the table, bringing us backstage to some of the most challenging moments of her creative life." Upon reviewing for the associated album, Clash called it as the "stand out track" of the album, commented: "['Light On' is] where infectious energy and choppy beats are enough to bob Rogers’ characteristically peppy vocals over some of the prettiest melody you are likely to hear this year." Writing for Variety, Chris Willman said the track "gets passionate about feeling strangely passionless."

Live performances
On November 3, 2018, Rogers performed the song during her appearance on the forty-fourth season of Saturday Night Live. The performance was met with a mixed response, with Bustle called it as "may not have been the best introduction". She performed it on Ellen on January 16, 2019. During her Heard It in a Past Life Tour stop at the O2 Academy, Brixton, England, she brought out lead vocalist Florence Welch of Florence and the Machine to perform the song. Rogers performed the track during her morning television debut set on Today Show on April 25, 2019.

Personnel
 Maggie Rogers – vocals, production, percussion
 Chris Allgood – mastering engineer assistance
 Julian Burg – engineering
 Serban Ghenea – mixing
 John Hanes – mixing engineering
 Kid Harpoon – production, acoustic guitar, bass guitar, electric guitar, piano, drum programming
 Greg Kurstin – production, bass, drums, guitar, keyboards, piano, engineering
 Emily Lazar – mastering
 Alex Pasco – engineering

Credits adapted from Tidal.

Track listings
 Digital download
"Light On" – 3:53

 Digital download – Winston Marshall Remix
"Light On"  – 5:11

Charts

Certifications

References

2018 singles
2018 songs
Capitol Records singles
Maggie Rogers songs
Songs written by Kid Harpoon
Song recordings produced by Greg Kurstin